Aua-Wuvulu Rural LLG is a local-level government (LLG) of Manus Province, Papua New Guinea.

Wards
01. Auna 1
02. Onnei 1
03. Aua Island 1
04. Aua 2
05. Onnei 2
06. Auna 2

References

Local-level governments of Manus Province